Matthias Walkner (born 1 September 1986) is an Austrian rally raid biker and former motocross rider, official driver of the team Red Bull KTM Factory for the Dakar Rally.

Biography
He won the 2012 FIM Motocross World Championship (MX3 class) and 2015 FIM Cross-Country Rallies World Championship. As single race of the world championship (cross-country), he has won 2015 Sardegna Rally Race and 2017 Rallye OiLibya du Maroc.

Dakar Rally

References

External links
 Biker profile at Redbull.com
 Official site

1986 births
Living people
Sportspeople from Salzburg
Dakar Rally motorcyclists
Off-road motorcycle racers
Austrian motocross riders
Dakar Rally winning drivers